This is a list of characters in the manga and live-action drama series What Did You Eat Yesterday?.

Primary characters 
  
 Portrayed by: Hidetoshi Nishijima
 A serious and reserved lawyer. At the start of the series, he is 43 years old and living with Kenji, his partner of three years. Shiro's defining character traits are his love of cooking and his frugality: he took a job at a small law firm so that he can leave promptly at 6 o'clock each day to cook dinner for himself and Kenji, delights in purchasing food on sale, and keeps a strict household budget. He developed an interest in cooking while trying to lose weight in his thirties, and has consequently maintained a handsome and youthful appearance well into middle age.

Much of Shiro's internal conflict stems from his belief that he simultaneously does not fit in with the gay community or with straight society. Unlike Kenji, he is not open about his sexuality, remaining closeted at work and keeping a distant relationship with his parents. While he expresses initial unease about perceived as gay in public, over the course of the series he improves his relationship with his parents and becomes more comfortable with being seen as Kenji's partner.
 
  
 Portrayed by: Seiyō Uchino
 A cheerful and outgoing hairdresser, and partner to Shiro. He is skilled at managing difficult hairdressing customers, earning the title of "bomb disposal specialist" among his co-workers, and is promoted to manager of the salon in chapter 112. Previously, he worked as a busboy at a host club, where he used the nickname "Joe" in reference to Ashita no Joe.

In contrast to Shiro's stoicism, Kenji is sociable, campy in his personal style and sense of humor, and open about his sexuality. He has a distant relationship with his family, which improves upon the death of his estranged father (see Kenji-associated characters below). After he begins balding in chapter 78, he cuts his formerly permed hair short and dyes it blond.

Shiro-associated characters 
  
 Portrayed by: Meiko Kaji
 Shiro's mother. In the manga, the shock of discovering Shiro's sexuality caused her to join a cult; she has subsequently become accepting of her son's sexuality, often to a fanatic degree, though she frequently confuses homosexuality and gender dysphoria. In the television drama, she is depicted as more reserved in her acceptance.

  
 Portrayed by: Kōtarō Shiga (episodes 1–5), Ryôsei Tayama (episodes 11–12)
 Shiro's father. Though accepting of his son, he is largely ignorant in his understanding of homosexuality.

  
 Portrayed by: Misako Tanaka
 A housewife and friend of Shiro's. They met by chance after purchasing and splitting a watermelon together, and bonded over their shared love of cooking and bargain hunting.

  
 Portrayed by: Toshihiro Yashiba
 Kayoko's husband. His first name is never given.

  
 Portrayed by: Marin
 Kayoko and Tominaga's adult daughter. She lives near their apartment, and frequently visits.

  
 Portrayed by: Atsuko Takaizumi
 The director of Shiro's law firm and expert in bankruptcy law.

 
 Portrayed by: Chan Kawai
 Yoshie's son, and a lawyer at Shiro's firm.

  
 Portrayed by: Yurika Nakamura
 A paralegal at Shiro's firm.

Kenji-associated characters 
  
 Portrayed by: Makita Sports
 Kenji's manager at the hair salon, and former cosmetology school classmate. At the beginning of the series he is married with two children, though he and his wife eventually divorce due to his infidelity. He later moves to Vietnam, and promotes Kenji to be the salon's new manager.

  
 Portrayed by: Kaoru Okunuki
 Yu's esthetician wife. Yu and Reiko divorce later in the series.

  
 Portrayed by: Bungo Uchida
 Kenji's estranged father, who appears only through flashbacks. He left the family while Kenji was still a child, returning irregularly to extort money from Kenji's mother Mineko; because Kenichi became violent during these incidents, Mineko was never able to formally divorce him. 20 years prior to the events of the series, the Yabuki family became aware that he was still alive after receiving notice that he had applied for welfare. In chapter 64, Kenji is notified by the police that Kenichi has died.

  
 Kenji's mother, who runs a hairdressing salon in Saitama. While her relationship with Kenji became strained after he came out to her, they reunite at Kenichi's funeral and begin to rebuild their relationship.

  
 Kenji's eldest sister. A hairdresser who lives in Saitama.

  
 Kenji's second eldest sister. While trained as a hairdresser, she works as a department store clerk.

Shiro and Kenji-associated characters 
  
 Portrayed by: Koji Yamamoto
 A colleague of Kayoko's husband, who later befriends Shiro and Kenji. He is handsome and stern, but becomes docile around his partner Wataru. Works as a director for an entertainment company.

  
 Portrayed by: Hayato Isomura
 Kohinata's spoiled and high-maintenance partner. While Kohinata describes him as a "pretty boy like Gilbert," in reality, he is an unkempt slacker. Works from home as a day trader.

  
 Portrayed by: Daikichi Sugawara
 An older gay man who manages several restaurants, and who is friends with Shiro and Kenji. As his parents are still living and he cannot marry his partner Yoshi, he asks for Shiro's assistance in adopting Yoshi as his heir so that he can pass his estate to him.

  
 Portrayed by: Bokuzō Masana
 Tetsuro's partner. A skilled cook who specializes in using organic ingredients.

  
 Portrayed by: Rie Miyazawa
 An idol and actress. Long admired by Shiro, he meets her through a meeting set up by Kohinata.

Notes

References

What Did You Eat Yesterday?